Mark Dickson and Cássio Motta were the defending champions, but lost in the quarterfinals to Bud Cox and Marc Flur.

Pavel Složil and Ferdi Taygan won the title by defeating Drew Gitlin and Blaine Willenborg 7–6(7–5), 6–1 in the final.

Seeds

Draw

Finals

Top half

Bottom half

References

External links
 Official results archive (ATP)
 Official results archive (ITF)

Sovran Bank Classic Doubles
Washington Star International
Washington Star International